Mobil 1 Rally Championship is a rally video game which is part of the Rally Championship series. It is a sequel to International Rally Championship (1997). The game was released for Windows in 1999. PC version was developed by Magnetic Fields and Creative Asylum and published by Actualize (formerly known as Europress). PlayStation version was developed by Atod and HotGen Studios and published by Electronic Arts. The Windows version is notable for stages based on real-life Ordnance Survey and Ordnance Survey of Northern Ireland maps. A sequel, Rally Championship Xtreme, was released in 2001.

Reception 

The PC version received favorable reviews, while the PlayStation version received mixed reviews, according to the review aggregation website GameRankings. Adam Pavlacka of NextGen said that the former version was "not quite the best rally game out there, but it is definitely a contender." Kraig Kujawa of Official U.S. PlayStation Magazine said that the PlayStation version "offers nothing out of the ordinary–everything is just good enough not to get low marks. The sluggish pace of the game and the non-familiarity with this particular race will ruin the game for most racing fans." Edge, however, said of the PC version, "Thoroughly absorbing and rarely anything less than thrilling, Championship is a revelation." Mark Kanarick of AllGame agreed, calling the same PC version "a fun, adrenaline-pumping game that is great to play alone or with others (via split-screen action or through a network). It is the best rally game to come along, and that is saying something."

The PC version was nominated for the "Best Driving Game" award at GameSpots Best and Worst of 2000 Awards, which went to Need for Speed: Porsche Unleashed.

References

External links 

Demo version at Internet Archive
Fixes for running Mobil 1 on Windows XP
Fix for multicore CPU's
Localisations (maps) of the stages on Google Maps

1999 video games
Electronic Arts games
ExxonMobil
Multiplayer and single-player video games
PlayStation (console) games
Rally racing video games
Video games developed in Sweden
Video games developed in the United Kingdom
Windows games
Magnetic Fields (video game developer) games
HotGen games